Sherlock Holmes and the Deadly Necklace (German: Sherlock Holmes und das Halsband des Todes) is a 1962 mystery film directed by Terence Fisher. It is a West German-French-Italian international co-production. The film starred Christopher Lee as Sherlock Holmes and Thorley Walters as Dr. Watson. Curt Siodmak wrote the screenplay, based on characters created by Sir Arthur Conan Doyle.

Plot
The film's plot has Sherlock Holmes and Dr. Watson attempting to recover a stolen necklace, formerly worn by Cleopatra, from Professor Moriarty. Holmes tries to convince the police that the professor is a criminal, but they are disbelieving.

Cast
 Christopher Lee as Sherlock Holmes
 Thorley Walters as Dr. Watson
 Senta Berger as Ellen Blackburn
 Hans Söhnker as Prof. Moriarty
 Hans Nielsen as Inspector Cooper
 Ivan Desny as Paul King
 Leon Askin as Charles, the chauffeur
 Wolfgang Lukschy as Peter Blackburn
 Edith Schultze-Westrum as Mrs. Hudson
 Bernard Lajarrige as Inspector French

Production
One-time Universal screenwriter Curt Siodmak (The Wolf Man) wrote the screenplay, based on the characters created by Sir Arthur Conan Doyle. The film was intended to be an adaptation of Doyle's final Holmes novel, The Valley of Fear, but only minor elements of this story remained.

West German producer Artur Brauner originally conceived the film as the first of a German film series. The producers' contact with the Arthur Conan Doyle estate led to the estate vetoing their original schemes to set the film in the present day such as the Edgar Wallace German film series and have Dr. Watson played by German comedian Heinz Erhardt. Many scenes of the film had to be reshot due to the Doyle estate not approving the dailies. Director Terence Fisher wrote memos to Brauner complaining the film was too static and not cinematic enough, leading to many rewrites by various uncredited screenwriters.

Filming took place in July and August 1962 in Ireland, London and the Spandau Studios in Berlin.

Lee donned a false nose to play the famous detective for the first time. (He later reprised the role on TV, in 1991's Incident at Victoria Falls and 1992's Sherlock Holmes and the Leading Lady). Lee and the rest of the cast were dubbed. Although Sherlock Holmes and the Deadly Necklace was originally filmed in English, the English language audio track was recorded post-production by different actors, mainly American. The film has a jazz score by Martin Slavin.

Thorley Walters again played Dr. Watson in The Best House in London (1969), The Adventure of Sherlock Holmes' Smarter Brother (1975), and Silver Blaze (1977).

Release
The film's German premiere was on 30 November 1962. The Italian version was released on 3 May 1963 and the French one (Sherlock Holmes et le collier de la mort) on 20 May 1964. Sherlock Holmes and the Deadly Necklace was not released to theatres in the United Kingdom until March 1968, and it went directly to television in the United States.

Reaction
Fisher and Lee were not happy with the film. Fisher called it "a film well worth left alone" and Lee said of it, "I think it was a pity, this film, in more ways than one. We should never have made it in Germany with German actors, although we had a British art director and a British director. It was a hodge podge of stories put together by the German producers, who ruined it. My portrayal of Holmes is, I think, one of the best things I've ever done because I tried to play him really as he was written, as a very intolerant, argumentative, difficult man, and I looked extraordinarily like him with the make-up. Everyone who's seen it said I was as like Holmes as any actor they've ever seen both in appearance and interpretation."

Segnalazione Cinematografiche criticised the film for reducing the tale to banalities and for being a sloppy adaption with modest performances by director and actors. However, the German Lexikon des internationalen Films called it "an amusing detective game" set at the turn of the century that came quite close to recreating "the strange attraction" of Conan Doyle's Holmes adventures.

The Monthly Film Bulletin said of the film that "apart from some startling anachronisms the period detail was on the whole nicely done", but Marjorie Bilbow of Cinema and T.V. Today said, "As a story woven around an unknown detective it would have been forgiveable, but classic characters demand more accurate handling than this." A more recent review from George R. Reis of DVDdrive-in.com called the film "an enjoyable little mystery" and Lee "a wonderful Holmes".

Charles Prepolec of the Holmes fan website BakerStreetDozen.com wrote, "There are some amusingly broad characters that add an element of humour, including a sadly Nigel Bruce-like performance from Thorley Walters. Comedic turns abound in a pub sequence with Holmes in his thug disguise. There are some well played scenes between Lee and Hans Söhnker, played out on a bench that echo the fantastic exchange between Holmes and Moriarty recorded in The Final Problem. Great stuff, but unfortunately not frequent enough in this film."

Home video
Retromedia Entertainment released Sherlock Holmes and the Deadly Necklace on DVD in 2005. In 2006, Alpha Video released a double feature DVD including Sherlock Holmes and the Deadly Necklace and the 1931 film The Speckled Band, starring Raymond Massey. In 2021 the film was released on Blu-Ray by Severin Films in the collection "The Eurocrypt of Christopher Lee".

References

External links

Films with screenplays by Curt Siodmak
1962 films
1960s mystery films
German mystery films
West German films
French mystery films
Italian mystery films
1960s German-language films
Sherlock Holmes films
Films directed by Terence Fisher
Constantin Film films
Films set in London
Films shot at Spandau Studios
English-language German films
1960s Italian films
1960s French films
1960s German films